"Tro på varann" is a song written by Uno Svenningsson and recorded by him as a duet together with Eva Dahlgren on his debut studio album as a solo artist, Uno, released in 1994. The song was also released as a single the same year.

The song charted at Trackslistan for two weeks between 12–19 November 1994. The song also charted at Svensktoppen for eight weeks between 19 November 1994-14 January 1995 peaking at fourth position. "Tro på varann" also charted on the Swedish singles chart, debuting at number 37 and peaking at number 22.

Other versions
Erik Linder recorded the song on his 2009 album Inifrån. Anders Wendin also sang the song during TV4s TV-show Så mycket bättre in 2017.

Chart positions

References 

1994 singles
Swedish-language songs
Male–female vocal duets
1994 songs
Songs written by Uno Svenningsson
Uno Svenningsson songs
Eva Dahlgren songs